Mörnsheim, or Moernsheim, is a municipality in the district of Eichstätt in Bavaria in Germany. It lies on the river Gailach and the surrounding rocks date back to the Late Jurassic (Tithonian).

References

Eichstätt (district)